Grigoris Pitsokos (born 9 August 1989) is a professional Greek football player currently playing for AEP Iraklis F.C. in the Football League 2 (Greece).

He played the majority of his career in Gamma Ethniki clubs, on loan from Iraklis. 
On 11 July 2011, he joined Doxa Drama, and was released on 23 December of the same year as a Free agent

On 4 January 2012, Pitsokos rejoined  Iraklis (now AEP Iraklis F.C.).

References

External links
Onsports.gr profile 

1989 births
Living people
Doxa Drama F.C. players
Iraklis Thessaloniki F.C. players
Super League Greece players
Greek footballers
Association football midfielders
Footballers from Thessaloniki